Lekhwair  is an airport serving the Lekhwair petroleum facility in western Oman.

See also
List of airports in Oman
Transport in Oman

References

External links
 OpenStreetMap - Lekhwair Airport
 OurAirports - Lekhwair Airport
 MBendi - Lekhwair
 

Airports in Oman